Mohamed Monir may refer to:

 Mohamed Mounir (born 1954), Egyptian singer and actor
 Mohamed Monir (swimmer) (born 1984), Egyptian swimmer
 Mohamed El Monir (born 1992), Libyan footballer